ALFA is a Myanmar Pop boy band formed by JBJ entertainment in 2019. The group has been strongly influenced by the Korean wave and popularity of K-pop following myanmar. ALFA has built up a strong local following in Yangon, Myanmar's commercial capgroup The Group is originally a seven-piece group , Kira & Bo Bo left the group in october 31, 2021.

The group debuted on 12 December 2019 with the single, "One N Only." The group's members were selected by an entertainment company, JBJ Entertainment, which held open auditions the previous year in Yangon. Two members, Jay and Adam were contestants in Galaxy Star, a singing competition organized by JBJ in 2017. ALFA's fan base is dubbed the ALFAVERSE.

Members
 Jay
 Adam 
 T Tant
 Kinice
 Min Khant

See also 
 Project K
 Music of Burma

References

External links
 
 

Musical groups established in 2019
Burmese musical groups
21st-century Burmese male singers
K-pop music groups
Boy bands
2019 establishments in Myanmar